Luc Schiltz (born 16 December 1980) is a Luxembourgish actor best known to international audiences for his role in the Netflix series Capitani.

Career
From 2003 to 2007, Schiltz studied drama at the Royal Conservatory of Liège, in Belgium. After graduating, he began taking acting jobs, both in theatre and on the screen, working in Luxembourg and Brussels.

In the 2016 edition of the Luxembourg Film Award, he won "Best Artistic Contribution" for his role in the film Eng nei Zäit and in 2021, he was named Best Actor for Capitani.

Selected filmography

Film

Television

References

External links
 

1980 births
21st-century Luxembourgian male actors
Luxembourgian male television actors
Luxembourgian male film actors
Living people